The 2014 Rice Owls football team represented Rice University in the 2014 NCAA Division I FBS football season. The team was led by eighth-year head coach David Bailiff and played its home games at Rice Stadium. The team was a member of the West Division of Conference USA. They finished the season 8–5, 5–3 in C-USA play to finish in a tie for second place in the West Division. They were invited to the Hawaii Bowl where they defeated Fresno State.

Personnel

Coaching staff

Schedule

Schedule Source:

Game summaries

Notre Dame

Texas A&M

Old Dominion

Southern Miss

Hawaii

Army

North Texas

FIU

UTSA

Marshall

Previous meeting was in the 2013 Conference USA Football Championship Game.

UTEP

Louisiana Tech

Fresno State–Hawaii Bowl

References

Rice
Rice Owls football seasons
Hawaii Bowl champion seasons
Rice Owls football